Oldenburg is a surname. Notable people with the surname include:

 Claes Oldenburg (1929–2022), Swedish-American sculptor
 Henry Oldenburg (c. 1619–1677), German diplomat and the first Secretary of the Royal Society
 Jen Flynn Oldenburg (born 1978), American volleyball player and coach
 Ray Oldenburg (born 1932), American sociologist
 Sergei Oldenburg (1863-1934), Russian ethnographer and politician
 Wilbrand van Oldenburg (before 1180–1233), a bishop of Paderborn and of Utrecht

See also
 Oldenberg